SF Sketchfest, or The San Francisco Comedy Festival, is an American comedy festival founded in 2002 by Bay Area actor-comedians David Owen, Janet Varney and Cole Stratton. It takes place every January and February in a variety of Bay Area venues and features sketch comedy, improv comedy, film and television tributes and reunions, solo performers, music, podcasts and stand-up comedy performers.

References

External links

SF Sketchfest official website

Culture of San Francisco
Festivals in the San Francisco Bay Area
Sketch comedy festivals
Comedy festivals in the United States
Recurring events established in 2002
2002 establishments in California